Miljko Četrović (born 4 November 1949) is a Serbian former politician. He served in the National Assembly of Serbia from 2004 to 2007 as a member of the far-right Serbian Radical Party (Srpska radikalna stranka, SRS).

Early life and career
Četrović was born in Kraljevo, in what was then the People's Republic of Serbia in the Federal People's Republic of Yugoslavia. He graduated from the University of Belgrade Faculty of Law in 1973.

Politician

Early years (2000–03)
Četrović became president of the Radical Party's Kraljevo board and appeared in the lead position on its electoral list for the Kraljevo division in the 2000 Yugoslavian parliamentary election. The list did not win any seats. Četrović was also the SRS's candidate in Kraljevo's fortieth division for the concurrent 2000 Serbian local elections and, like all Radical Party candidates in Kraljevo during this cycle, was defeated.

The 2000 Yugoslavian elections saw the defeat of incumbent president Slobodan Milošević, a watershed moment in Serbian and Yugoslavian politics. The Serbian government fell after the Yugoslavian vote, and a new Serbian parliamentary election was held in December 2000. Serbia's electoral laws were reformed prior to the election, such that the entire country became a single division and all mandates were awarded to candidates on successful lists at the discretion of the sponsoring parties and coalitions, irrespective of numerical order. Četrović appeared in the eighty-fifth position on the Radical Party's list and was not given a mandate when the list won twenty-three seats.

Kraljevo held early local elections in 2003. By this time, Serbia had introduced both the direct election of mayors and proportional representation for local assembly elections. Četrović ran as the SRS's mayoral candidate and was defeated in the first round; he was, however, elected to the municipal assembly when the party's list won thirteen seats.

Parliamentarian (2003–07)
Četrović appeared in the fifty-sixth position on the Radical Party's list in the 2003 Serbian parliamentary election and was this time included in his party's delegation when the list won eighty-two mandates. He took his seat when the assembly met in January 2004. Although the Radicals were the largest party in this sitting of the legislature, they fell well short of a majority and ultimately served in opposition. This notwithstanding, Četrović was chosen in February 2004 as president of the assembly committee for relations with Serbs outside of Serbia. He also served on the finance committee and the privatization committee.

Četrović attempted to initiate a recall election against Kraljevo's sitting mayor Radoslav Jović in late 2005. Jović instead chose to resign from office, saying that he did not want to defend his position at the expense of taxpayers. A by-election was held to select his replacement in February 2006; Četrović ran as the Radical Party's candidate and was defeated in the second round of voting.

In November 2006, Četrović left the Radical Party's caucus in the municipal assembly and formed a new a group called the "Free Radicals." He indicated that his decision was rooted in "irreconcilable differences" with Vjerica Radeta, the Radical Party's leader for the Raška District, whom he charged with using "lies, fraud and nonsense" to interfere with the work of SRS municipal board. He did not appear on the SRS's list in the 2007 Serbian parliamentary election and his term in the national assembly ended in that year. He was also not re-elected to the Kraljevo assembly in the 2008 local elections and appears to have withdrawn from public life after this time.

Electoral record

Local (Kraljevo)

References

1949 births
Living people
Politicians from Kraljevo
Members of the National Assembly (Serbia)
Serbian Radical Party politicians